Rosalyn Benjamin Darling (born  1950) is professor emeritus of sociology at Indiana University of Pennsylvania where she has been a member of the faculty since 1994. Darling is a specialist in orientations towards disability.

She earned her PhD from the University of Connecticut in 1978.

Selected publications
Families against society: A study of reactions to children with birth defects. SAGE Publications, Beverly Hills, 1979. 
Ordinary families, special children : a systems approach to childhood disability. Guilford Press, New York, 1989.  (With Milton Seligman)
Families, physicians, and children with special health needs : collaborative medical education models. Auburn House, Westport, Conn., 1994.  (With Margo Peter)
Families in focus: Sociological methods in early intervention. Pro-Ed, Austin, Tex.: 1996.  (With Christine Baxter)
Disability and identity: Negotiating self in a changing society. Lynne Rienner Publishers, 2013.

References 

Living people
University of Connecticut alumni
Indiana University of Pennsylvania faculty
1950s births
American sociologists
American women sociologists
21st-century American women